Chahe is a town in Lai'an County, Anhui. , it administers the following neighborhoods, communities, residential zones, and villages:
Jingangwan
Tianhe Community
Linxi Community
Xiangrong Community
Yangminghu Community
Chahe Economic Development Zone Community
Wangbodang Farm Residential Zone
Chahe Village
Tangqiao Village
Wenshan Village
Zhangpu Village
Chengji Village
Huangpai Village
Dongqing Village
Wanglai Village
Xiangguan Village
Daya Village
Chentang Village
Chumao Village

References

Lai'an County
Towns in Anhui